Irreversible may refer to:
Irreversible process, in thermodynamics, a process that is not reversible
Irréversible, a 2002 film
Irréversible (soundtrack), soundtrack to the film Irréversible
 An album recorded by hip-hop artist Grieves
 A song by progressive metalcore band Erra from their 2016 album Drift